The Women's 4 × 100 metre medley relay competition of the swimming events at the 2015 World Aquatics Championships was held on 9 August with the heats and with the final.

Records
Prior to the competition, the existing world and championship records were as follows.

Results

Heats
The heats were held at 10:48.

Final
The final was held at 19:25.

References

Women's 4 x 100 metre medley relay
2015 in women's swimming